Selva is an Indian actor who has worked on Tamil-language films in leading and supporting roles. After appearing in several films as a lead actor in the 1990s, he made a comeback in two films directed by Mysskin in the 2010s.

Family and early life 
Selva was born in Lakshmipuram, Theni district of Tamil Nadu in a Tamil family to D. C Varadharajan, a retired police officer and Andal. His brother Rajasekhar, is also an actor who has appeared in Telugu language films. Selva grew up in Annanagar and attended Madras Christian College in Chetput.

Career 
In 1991, Selva made his acting debut in the village drama Aatha Un Koyilile co-starring with Kasthuri and directed by Kasthuri Raja. The film completed a 100-day run at the box-office. He then acted in R. Umashankar's Thambi Oorukku Pudhusa. In 1992, he appeared in Manobala's Senbaga Thottam and in Kizhakku Veedhi. In 1993, he appeared in the double hero subject Maamiyar Veedu starring Saravanan, in Rakkayi Koyil and in his first city-based film Madurai Meenakshi. In the beginning of 1994, he acted in the village drama Sakthivel co-starring with Kanaka, the film was directed by K. S. Ravikumar and produced by AVM Productions. In mid-1994, he played the role of a student in the Telugu film Gangmaster, in which his brother Rajasekhar played the lead role. Then, he played the role of an angry young man in the village drama Maindhan; the critic Malini Mannath of The New Indian Express said: "Selva has acquitted himself quite well". In late 1994, he acted in Gangai Amaran's Atha Maga Rathiname. In 1995, he teamed up for the second with director R. Umashankar in Mannai Thottu Kumbidanum. In 1996, he acted as a folk dancer in the successful Nattupura Pattu, directed by Kasthuri Raja. He then appeared in Puthiya Parasakthi, co-starring Sukanya and Napoleon. In 1997, he acted in Rama Narayanan's Nattupura Nayagan. In 1998, he directed and acted in the comedy entertainer Golmaal. The film was declared as a below average venture at the box office and it became his final project before leaving the film industry. He then accepted to act in Bala's debut film Sethu, but he was then replaced by Vikram.

After being away from the industry for 14 years, he worked as a dialogue writer for the Tamil dubbed versions of the Telugu films of his brother Rajasekhar. Director Mysskin called him to appear in a negative role in the crime thriller Yuddham Sei (2011), which marked his comeback. Mysskin then signed him on to work on his next film, the superhero film Mugamoodi (2012), portraying a Kung Fu master to Jiiva's character. In order to get ready for the film, he practised Kung Fu for six months under the supervision of the Mansuria Kung Fu teacher R. Shekhar, and read books on the martial art. The film, however, opened to negative reviews and became a box office disaster.

Filmography 

Actor

Dubbing artist

References

External links 
 

Tamil male actors
Male actors from Chennai
Living people
Male actors in Tamil cinema
Indian male film actors
Film directors from Tamil Nadu
Tamil film directors
Year of birth missing (living people)